William Henry Gocher (20 March 1856 – 18 August 1921) was an Australian artist and bimetallist who campaigned to end the ban on daylight sea bathing in Sydney.

Gocher was born in Ipswich in Suffolk to salesman Charles Gocher and Louisa King. He attended St John's College at Hurstpierpoint and converted to Roman Catholicism, coming to Australia around 1872. He worked as an artist in Sydney from around 1884. On 2 May 1888 he married Elizabeth Josephine Storm at Surry Hills. He was part of the bimetallic movement in the 1890s and was vice-president of the Bimetallic League of New South Wales; he also admired William Jennings Bryan and supported Federation, believing it would save Australia from the "jeers of Jews, capitalists and the press". He ran unsuccessfully for the Senate in 1901 and for the New South Wales Parliament in 1901 and 1904, continuing to campaign for bimetallism as president of the Australian Currency League from 1912 to 1918. A 1918 pamphlet, Australia Must be Heard, implored the Pope to bring about an armistice.

A writer for John Norton's Truth, he established the Manly and Sydney News in 1900 when he and his family moved to Manly. As part of a campaign against the ban on daylight bathing, he announced his intention to swim at midday in October 1902; the police took him away after he criticised their laxness, and he was not charged with any crimes. In November 1903 Manly Council legalised all-day bathing; many attributed Gocher with the victory. He returned to the city in 1906 and launched the Balmain Banner. Having been devastated by one of his sons' death at Messines, he suffered a stroke in 1917 and died in 1921 of arteriosclerosis and chronic nephritis.

References

1856 births
1921 deaths
19th-century Australian journalists
English emigrants to Australia
19th-century Australian male writers
20th-century Australian journalists
20th-century Australian male writers
Australian male journalists
Writers from Ipswich